Atwill-Morin is a Canadian company specializing in masonry restoration and heritage preservation. The business was founded in April 2007 by the three Atwill-Morin brothers.

Accomplishments
Canada Parliament - Ottawa, Ontario  
The Linton Appartements - Montréal, Québec  
M sur la Montragne Luxury Condominium - Montréal, Québec 
The Maison du Citoyen - Gatineau, Québec 
Outremont Theater - Montréal, Québec

References

Construction and civil engineering companies established in 2007
2007 establishments in Quebec